The following is an incomplete list of paintings by the Italian Baroque artist Orazio Gentileschi. Catalogue numbers abbreviated "MET" are from the 2001 publication by the Metropolitan Museum of Art.

References

Gentileschi